is a Japanese professional footballer who plays as a midfielder for Liga 1 club Arema.

Career

Singapore
Getting a fellow card on his debut and performing prosaically for Hougang United in a 0-0 stalemate with Geylang International in 2015, Yamaguchi was released with Takashi Manato by June that year.

Laos
One of Lao Toyota's foreign imports from 2016, the Japanese defender was selected for the Lao Premier League All-Stars for their game opposing the Cambodian League All-Stars in 2016.

Indonesia
On 21 June 2021, Renshi signed a year contract with Arema from the Indonesian Liga 1. Renshi made his league debut in a 1–1 draw against PSM Makassar on 5 September 2021.

Honours

Clubs 
Lao Toyota
 Lao Premier League: 2015, 2017, 2018

Arema
 Indonesia President's Cup: 2022

References

External links 
 Soccerway Profile

Japanese expatriate footballers
Living people
Hougang United FC players
Lao Toyota F.C. players
Renshi Yamaguchi
Renshi Yamaguchi
Renshi Yamaguchi
Arema F.C. players
Singapore Premier League players
Lao Premier League players
Renshi Yamaguchi
Liga 1 (Indonesia) players
Japanese expatriate sportspeople in Singapore
Expatriate footballers in Singapore
Japanese expatriate sportspeople in Laos
Expatriate footballers in Laos
Japanese expatriate sportspeople in Thailand
Expatriate footballers in Thailand
Japanese expatriate sportspeople in Indonesia
Expatriate footballers in Indonesia
Japanese footballers
Association football defenders
1992 births